Haderonia is a genus of moths of the family Noctuidae.

Species
 Haderonia alpina (Draudt, 1950)
 Haderonia aplectoides (Draudt, 1950)
 Haderonia arschanica (Alphéraky, 1882)
 Haderonia chinensis (Draudt, 1950)
 Haderonia contempta (Püngeler, 1914)
 Haderonia iomelas (Draudt, 1950)
 Haderonia khorgossi (Alphéraky, 1882)
 Haderonia lasiestrina (Draudt, 1950)
 Haderonia longicornis (Graeser, 1892)
 Haderonia lupa (Christoph, 1893)
 Haderonia nefasta (Püngeler, 1907)
 Haderonia optima Alphéraky, 1897
 Haderonia persimilis (Draudt, 1950)
 Haderonia proximoides Wiltshire, 1982
 Haderonia subarschanica (Staudinger, 1895)
 Haderonia tancrei (Graeser, 1892)
 Haderonia thermolimna Boursin, 1964
 Haderonia turpis (Staudinger, 1900)
 Haderonia zetina (Staudinger, 1900)

References
Natural History Museum Lepidoptera genus database
Haderonia at funet

Hadeninae